Courtney-Junior Mitchell-Smith (born January 12, 1998) is a Canadian professional soccer player.

Early career
Smith began playing soccer with Grand Valley Minor Soccer, before moving to Brampton East SC. Afterwards, Smith joined the ProStars FC Academy. In February 2016, he joined the U19 side of Hungarian club ETO FC Győr.

College career
In 2017, he began attending Mississippi Gulf Coast Community College. He scored his first goal on September 1, 2017, against the Jones Bobcats, scoring twice and adding an assist. On October 5, 2018, he scored a hat trick against the Meridian Eagles. For the 2018 season, Smith was selected to play in the Mississippi Association of Community & Junior Colleges Men's All-Star Soccer Game (however the match was cancelled due to poor field conditions) and was named to the United Soccer Coaches Men's NJCAA Division I All-South Region team.

In 2019, he transferred to the University of South Carolina to play for the men's soccer team. He scored his first goals on October 1, scoring twice against the Presbyterian Blue Hose.

In 2020, he transferred to Georgia Southern University to play for the Georgia Southern Eagles. He made six appearances, including two starts, recording one assist.

In 2021, he began attending Houston Baptist University, where he played for the Houston Baptist Huskies. In his debut on August 26, he scored a golden goal winner in extra time over the St. Thomas Tommies. He appeared in all 17 matches, scoring five goals, which all came within the team's first five games, including a two-goal performance against the Huston–Tillotson Rams.

Club career
In 2016, he returned to ProStars FC and played in League1 Ontario. After facing Toronto FC III during a league match, he was invited to train with the Toronto FC Academy.

In 2017, he played for Master's FA in League1 Ontario.

In 2018 and 2019, he played with the Colorado Pride Switchbacks U23 in USL League Two. He scored his first goals on May 26, 2018, netting a brace against Albuquerque Sol FC, which earned him PDL Western Conference Team of the Week honours.

In 2021, he played for Port City FC in the National Premier Soccer League. He scored his first goal on May 27 against Jacksonville Armada U-23. He scored a brace on June 5 against Florida Roots FC.

In March 2022, Smith signed a professional contract with Canadian Premier League club HFX Wanderers FC, immediately being sent on an intra-league loan to FC Edmonton. He scored his first goal on September 10 against York United FC.

References

External links

1998 births
Living people
Association football forwards
Canadian soccer players
Soccer players from Brampton
Georgia Southern Eagles men's soccer players
South Carolina Gamecocks men's soccer players
Houston Christian Huskies men's soccer players
League1 Ontario players
National Premier Soccer League players
USL League Two players
Canadian Premier League players
Master's FA players
FC Edmonton players